Ellen S. Pressman is an American television director and producer.

She began her career as an associate producer on the series Hill Street Blues in 1983.  She went on to win an Emmy Award as a member of the L.A. Law production team.  She made her directorial debut on Thirtysomething.

Her other directorial credits include Sirens, Missing Persons, My So-Called Life, Party of Five, Arliss, Buffy the Vampire Slayer, Hyperion Bay, Charmed, Felicity, Time of Your Life, Pasadena, American Dreams, Huff, Jack & Bobby, Everwood and Windfall, which was her last directing episode of Riverdale in 2017, and Once Upon a Time, Life Sentence,  and Nashville in 2018 and ‘’Grand Hotel’’ in 2019.

References

External links

American television producers
American women television producers
American television directors
Emmy Award winners
American women television directors
Living people
Place of birth missing (living people)
Year of birth missing (living people)
21st-century American women